Vappala Balachandran is an Indian national security intelligence specialist. He worked as a police officer in Maharashtra in the 1960s and early 70s, and subsequently for the Cabinet Secretariat of the Government of India, where he was appointed Special Secretary.

He is the author of three books, two on security and one on the life of A.C.N. Nambiar.

Balachandran has also written newspaper columns on security and strategic subjects in Indian and foreign publications.

Early life

Balachandran originally hails from the state of Kerala, Southern India. His father, K.P. Kutti Krishna Menon, was an officer in the Myanmar government and he lived in Yangon till 1940. During World War 2, his father stayed back in Myanmar to serve the government.

Balachandran is the grand nephew of V.P. Menon from Ottapalam, Kerala.

Career
From 1961 to 1965, Balachandran was an Assistant Superintendent of Police in Nashik in northern Maharashtra. Between 1965 and 1972 he was Superintendent of Police, first in Sangli district and then in Yeotmal district. He was appointed Deputy Commissioner of Police in Bombay (present-day Mumbai) in 1972.

In 1976 he started working for the Indian government's Cabinet Secretariat in New Delhi. He retired in 1995.

Between 2007 and 2009 he wrote several papers for the Henry L. Stimson Center, Washington, D.C. for their "Regional Voices" project. His paper "Insurgency, terrorism, and transnational trends" was included as Chapter 6 in their publication Transnational Trends. 

Balachandran along with R. D. Pradhan was a member of the two-man "High Level Committee" appointed by the Government of Maharashtra to inquire into the police response during the Mumbai 26 November 2008 terror attacks. This committee gave scathing remarks about systemic degeneration of security establishments such as A.T.S. Maharashtra.

In November 2009 he was invited by the Governor of Hawaii to be the keynote speaker at the 2009 Asia Pacific Homeland Security Summit at Honolulu and address senior police officials in Singapore on urban security and terrorism. Balachandran spoke at the Pluscarden Programme conference on "The Future of International Cooperation in Countering Violent Extremism" at St Antony's College, Oxford University in October 2010 and in 2013 on "India’s Politics of Free Expression-A Law & Order perspective" under the "Marchioness of Winchester Lectures 2013". The interview was aired by the BBC radio along with three other participants.

Vappala Balachandran is also an active columnist who writes for The Sunday Guardian and The Asian Age newspapers.

Awards 

In 1975, Balachandran was awarded the Indian Police Medal for meritorious service and in 1986, The President's Police medal for meritorious service.

Books 
 National Security and Intelligence Management-A New Paradigm (2014)
 A life in Shadow (2017)
 Keeping India Safe: The Dilemma of Internal Security (2017)

References

Writers from Mumbai
1937 births
21st-century Indian non-fiction writers
Living people